Maurice Anne Fernand Le Roux or Leroux (6 February 1923, Paris, France – 19 October 1992 in Avignon, France) was a French composer and conductor. He studied composition at the Paris Conservatory and was a student of Olivier Messiaen. His work includes 19 original film scores and a number of television scores and orchestrations.1

Filmography 

As Composer
 1952 : Crin-Blanc
 1955 : Bad Liaisons (Les Mauvaises rencontres)
 1956 : Les Possédées
 1956 : Le Ballon rouge
 1956 : The Wages of Sin
 1957 : Amère victoire (English title: Bitter Victory)
 1958 : Le Piège
 1958 : That Night
 1958 : Les Mistons
 1960 : Présentation ou Charlotte et son steak
 1961 : Vu du pont
 1961 : Les Mauvais coups
 1963 : Le petit soldat
 1966 : Martin Soldat
 1967 : La Bien-aimée (TV)
 1968 : La Chamade
 1969 : Baltagul
 1973 : Kamouraska
 1973 : Immoral Tales
 1979 : Les Jardins secrets (TV)
 1981 : Un étrange voyage
 1982 : La Guérilléra

As Orchestrator
 1955 : Cap-aux-sorciers (TV series)
 1957 : Le Survenant (TV series)

Citations 
 1IMDB.
 2New Grove Dictionary of Music and Musicians.

External links
Biographical details (in German)

French male composers
French male conductors (music)
1923 births
1992 deaths
Pupils of René Leibowitz
20th-century French composers
20th-century French conductors (music)
20th-century French male musicians